Jonathan Goldblatt, who writes under the pen name Julius Sharpe, is an American television writer, producer and show-runner of Making History and United We Fall.

Biography 
Sharpe received his B.A. from Columbia University in 1995. He started his TV writing career as a writer for The Late Late Show with Craig Ferguson and Late Late Show with Craig Kilborn. He was also a writer for Comedy Central's Weekends at the DL and The Showbiz Show with David Spade.

In 2014, Sharpe inked an overall deal with 20th Century FOX Television, where he created and executive produced the comedy series Making History. He was also co-executive producer of The Grinder and worked as a writer, producer, and voice actor for Seth MacFarlane's Family Guy, The Cleveland Show and co-executive produced the live-action Cristela and Dads.

In 2017, Sharpe signed a two-year overall deal at Sony Television. He created and produced the 2020 television series United We Fall. In 2017, he was reported to be executive producing a television adaptation of the movie Stripes.

Personal life 
Sharpe is married to actress and producer Stephanie Escajeda. The series United We Fall was based on the actual life and relationship between Sharpe and Escajeda.

References 

Living people

Year of birth missing (living people)
Columbia College (New York) alumni
American television writers
American television producers